Dimitar Tapkoff (12 July 1929 – 7 May 2011) was a Bulgarian musician, music educator and composer.

Life and career
Dimitar Tapkoff was born in Sofia, Bulgaria, and studied composition with Bulgarian composer Marin Goleminov. After completing his studies, he worked with Bulgarian National Radio, Sofia National Opera, the Bulgarian Academy of Sciences, the Bulgarian State Academy of Music and the Ministry of Culture. In 1971 he became a professor of composition at the Academy of Music and Dance Art in Plovdiv. He also served as the director of the Sofia Music Weeks International Music Festival. His works have been performed internationally and recorded.

Honors and awards
First prize of the International Composer's Rostrum, Paris, 1976 for Peace Cantata

Works
Tapkoff composes in a number of genres, including choral, instrumental and orchestral music. Selected works include:

Peace Cantata, Microsymphony 
Variants for String Orchestra, 
Concertino for Bassoon and String Orchestra 
Sonata for Violoncello 
Sonata for Clarinet

References

1929 births
2011 deaths
20th-century classical composers
Bulgarian music educators
Bulgarian classical composers
International Rostrum of Composers prize-winners
Male classical composers
20th-century male musicians